Solomon Bob (1970) is a Nigerian lawyer and politician from People's Democratic Party. He represents Abua/Odual and Ahoada East constituency in the House of Representatives of Nigeria, a post he was elected to in 2019. He is a former Special Adviser to Governor Ezenwo Nyesom Wike of Rivers State.

Political career 
Bob was elected to the Nigerian National House of Representatives in the general election of 2019 to represent Abua/Odual and Ahoada East. During this time he sponsored a bill to remove Local Government as a tier of government in the Constitution of the Federal Republic of Nigeria.

References 

Peoples Democratic Party (Nigeria) politicians
1970 births
People from Rivers State
Members of the House of Representatives (Nigeria) from Rivers State
Living people